The Township of Alnwick/Haldimand is a township in central Ontario, Canada, in Northumberland County, situated between Lake Ontario and Rice Lake. It was formed in 2001 by the merger of Alnwick Township in the north and Haldimand Township in the south.  Alderville First Nation is an autonomously governed First Nation contained within the township boundaries, in two non-contiguous sections along County Roads 45 and 18.

History

Alnwick Township 
Alnwick Township was originally surveyed in 1795 when twenty-four lots were laid out on the first concession. It was named for Alnwick in Northumberland, England. The first crown grants were issued in 1798 and other surveys would follow in subsequent years.  The township's first residents were made up of United Empire Loyalists, attracted by large unencumbered land grants, sometimes in the thousands of acres.  In 1835, 3,600 acres of land along the first and second concessions were set aside as an Indian settlement. Shortly after, the Indian Band from Grape Island was moved into this settlement and a school and church were built at Alderville.  The first council meeting was held in 1845 at Alderville School. The Alnwick/Haldimand Township building located in Grafton was built in 1858. Prior to its construction, Township Council meetings were held at local taverns or the residences of council members.

Haldimand Township 
Haldimand Township was formed in 1791 and was named in honour of Sir Frederick Haldimand – a British general who served as Governor-in-Chief of Canada between 1778 and 1796.  By 1804, there were 356 settlers in Haldimand Township making it the second most populous township in the region after Hamilton Township to the West.  The town hall was constructed in 1860. However, in order to be as accessible to as many rate payers as possible, council held frequent meetings in public buildings in towns across the Township. On one occasion following a fire that destroyed the Centreton Community Centre in 1943, a council meeting was held at the private residence of former reeve Stanley McBride.

Municipal restructuring 
As part of provincial initiatives in the late 1990s, the Government of Ontario pursued a policy of municipal amalgamations to rationalize municipal levels of government services and  "reduc[e] government entanglement and bureaucracy with an eye to eliminating waste and duplication as well as unfair downloading by the province".  On June 9, 1999, an order from the Ontario Minister of Municipal Affairs for the amalgamation of Alnwick Township and Haldimand Township into a single Township of Alnwick/Haldimand received Royal assent. The amalgamation came into effect on January 1, 2001.

Geography

Geographical features 
Alnwick/Haldimand is part of the Oak Ridges Moraine: a significant land form in Ontario.

31.3 km2 of the Cobourg Creek watershed runs through the Township. The majority of this area is located within the Oak Ridges Moraine.  The Creek supports a diverse ecosystem including forests, meadows and wetlands. Numerous species inhabit the Creek including brown trout, rainbow trout, scuplins and darters. Migratory Chinook Salmon spawn in the creek and Atlantic Salmon are being stocked as part of a provincial initiative to return these native fish to Lake Ontario.

The Ganaraska Forest is an 11,000-acre forest located in the Township. It is one of the largest blocks of forested land in southern Ontario.  The Millvalley Hills Forest is a 297 hectare forest located within the Township of Alnwick/Haldimand. The dominant trees species are red and white pine, and red and white oak, however red oak dominates the area.

The Harwood Road Wetland is a class 2 provincially significant wetland located in the Township of Hamilton and the Township of Alnwick/Haldimand.  95.9 hectares in size, the wetland is 95% swamp, and 0.5% marsh.

Communities 
The township comprises the communities of Burnley, Carmel, Centreton, Dunnette Landing, Fenella, Grafton, The Gully, Lakeport, Little Germany, McCracken Landing, Oak Heights, Robins Landing, Roseneath, Vernonville and Wicklow.

Alderville First Nation 
The Alderville First Nation is an Anishinaabe First Nation located in southern Ontario, Canada. As of September 2008, Alderville First Nation had 1007 registered band members, of which their on-Reserve population was only 313 people, meaning the majority of their registered population live outside the reserve (off-reserve) in neighbouring communities.

The First Nation have reserved for themselves two areas. Their main reserve, the Alderville First Nation (formerly designated as Alderville Indian Reserve 37 by Indian and Northern Affairs Canada), is located near the south shores of Rice Lake in Ontario. They also maintain a smaller parcel of land on nearby Sugar Island, the  Sugar Island 37A Indian Reserve. It has been home to the Mississauga division of the Anishinaabe (Ojibwa) Nation since the mid-1830s.

Economy 
The township is rural based with agriculture being the largest contributor to the general economy. Grain, cash crops, milk, livestock, vineyards and apple farming are all viable in the area.  The top industries for the employed labour force are manufacturing, public administration and construction. Approximately 15% of workers were self-employed as of the 2011 Census of Canada.

Tourism is also a contributor to the local economy. Venues such as Golden Beach Resort and Ste. Anne's Country Inn & Spa are among the top private sector employers in Northumberland County.  Outdoor activities including hiking, kayaking, snowmobiling, fishing, birding and camping also contribute to the tourism industry.

Demographics 

As of the 2011 Census of Canada, Alnwick/Haldimand had a median age of 46.6 years.

According to the 2011 National Household Survey, 13.1% of the population was foreign-born and 86.6% were Canadian born. The most common countries of birth of immigrants living in Alnwick/Haldimand are the United Kingdom (62% of the immigrant population) and the Netherlands (6.4%).

Religion 
According to the 2011 National Household Survey, 72.7% of the population in Alnwick/Haldimand reported a religious affiliation while 27.4% said they had no religious affiliation. The most common religion was the United Church (22.3%), followed by Anglicanism, (22.2%) and Roman Catholicism (13.5%).

Languages spoken 
Mother tongue:
 English as first language: 92.4%
 French as first language: 1.2%
 English and French as first language: 0.2%
 Other as first language: 6.2%

Government

Local government 
Alnwick/Haldimand has a Township Council of 5 members including a Mayor, Deputy Mayor, and three ward councillors. Normally, they are elected for four-year terms, along with all other municipalities in Ontario. The next election is scheduled to take place in 2022. On the current council, Greg Booth was selected to replace Raymond Benns, who died in March, 2019.

In addition to the Township Council, members sit on a number of local committees.

Township Council 2018 - 2022 

Source:

County government 
Alnwick/Haldimand is part of Northumberland County. County Council is composed of the mayors of each of the seven towns, townships and local municipalities within its boundaries. The head of County Council is called the Warden as is elected annually from amongst its membership.

Alnwick/Haldimand Mayor John Logel serves as the representative on the County Council.

Provincial representation 
Alnwick/Haldimand is in the provincial electoral district of Northumberland—Peterborough South, represented by David Piccini of the Progressive Conservative Party of Ontario.

Federal representation 
As of the 2015 Federal Election, Alnwick/Haldimand is in the federal electoral district of Northumberland—Peterborough South.  This riding was created by the 2012 federal electoral boundaries redistribution and came into effect upon the calling of the 42nd Canadian federal election.  The riding has been represented by Philip Lawrence of the Conservative Party of Canada since 2019.

See also
 List of municipalities in Ontario
 List of townships in Ontario

References

External links

Township municipalities in Ontario
Lower-tier municipalities in Ontario
Municipalities in Northumberland County, Ontario